Michael Seth McClung (born February 7, 1981), nicknamed Big Red, is an American former professional baseball pitcher. In his career, he pitched as a starting pitcher and as a relief pitcher.

Career

Tampa Bay Devil Rays
McClung began the  season with the Tampa Bay Devil Rays as a starting pitcher, was sent later that year to the minor leagues, and was converted to be a closer.

Milwaukee Brewers
He started the  season in Triple-A Durham of the International League, before being traded to the Milwaukee Brewers for Grant Balfour on July 27. He was then assigned to the Nashville Sounds of the Pacific Coast League before being called up to Milwaukee on August 21, making his debut with the Brewers in a relief appearance on the same day.

He began the  season in the Brewers bullpen, later being moved into the rotation in place of Carlos Villanueva. His first appearance as a starter for Milwaukee was against the Washington Nationals on May 24. After the Brewers traded for CC Sabathia, McClung and Dave Bush shared a spot in the rotation with Bush pitching on the road and McClung pitching at home. This experiment ended on August 2, with Bush taking the rotation spot and McClung moving to the bullpen.

Florida Marlins
On February 1, 2010, McClung signed a minor league contract with the Florida Marlins with an invite to spring training. He was released on March 30.

Texas Rangers
On December 17, 2010 the Texas Rangers signed McClung. He was released on July 13, 2011.

Second stint with Brewers
On January 10, 2012, McClung signed a minor league deal with the Brewers. On July 31, McClung was released. He went 2–13 with a 6.36 ERA in 21 appearances (20 starts) with Triple-A Nashville.

Chicago Cubs
On August 12, McClung signed a minor league deal with the Chicago Cubs. In 2013, McClung pitched for the Sultanes de Monterrey of the Mexican League.

Pittsburgh Pirates
McClung signed a minor league deal with the Pittsburgh Pirates on November 20, 2013. He was released on March 22, 2014.

Personal life

McClung is the uncle of internet sensation and Philadelphia 76ers basketball star Mac McClung. Mac grew up going to games and spending time with his big league uncle, surrounding himself with high levels of success at a young age. Seth could be attributed to inspiring the younger McClung as he encouraged Mac to achieve greatness and for his "younger generation of the family to pass [his] accomplishments".

References

External links

 MLB.com: Seth McClung

1981 births
Living people
American expatriate baseball players in Mexico
Bakersfield Blaze players
Baseball players from West Virginia
Charleston RiverDogs players
Durham Bulls players
Hudson Valley Renegades players
Iowa Cubs players
Major League Baseball pitchers
Mexican League baseball pitchers
Milwaukee Brewers players
Montgomery Biscuits players
Nashville Sounds players
Orlando Rays players
People from Lewisburg, West Virginia
Pericos de Puebla players
Princeton Devil Rays players
Round Rock Express players
Sultanes de Monterrey players
Tampa Bay Devil Rays players